Mamadou Diouf may refer to:

 Mamadou Diouf (historian), professor of African studies and Western African history
 Mamadou Diouf (footballer) (born 1990), Senegalese footballer
 Mamadou Diouf (musician), musician and writer of Senegalese descent